Vivian Beaumont Allen (March 22, 1885 – October 10, 1962), also known simply as Vivian Beaumont, was an American actress, philanthropist, and heiress. A patron of Broadway theater in New York City, she funded construction of the namesake Vivian Beaumont Theater at Lincoln Center, which was completed after her death. She was founder of the Vivian Beaumont Society, a charitable organization.

 
Allen died in 1962 at 77 years of age and was interred at the Woodlawn Cemetery in the Bronx.

The Vivian Beaumont Theater, which is found at Lincoln Center in New York City, New York was open to the public on October 21, 1965.  Over the years it has gone through many different managements, became one of the largest not-for-profit theaters, and holds many plays and musicals. It was named in her honor due to her many charitable works. Her society, the Vivian Beaumont Society, still encourages others to be involved in the theater.

References

External links
 

1885 births
1962 deaths
Philanthropists from New York (state)
Burials at Woodlawn Cemetery (Bronx, New York)
Actresses from New York City
Activists from New York (state)
20th-century American philanthropists
20th-century American women